Countryside is a city in Cook County, Illinois, United States. Per the 2020 census, the population was 6,420.

History
The land where Countryside sits was originally inhabited by the Potawatomi Indians and later by early American pioneers in the beginning of the 19th century. Settler Joseph Vial and his family were among the first non-native people to settle in the Countryside area in 1833.

The area remained large expanses of rural farmland until the Great Chicago Fire of 1871, when the fire sent thousands of city dwellers into what is now west suburban Chicago. Land sold for only $2 an acre, which made areas such as Countryside a welcome respite from the congestion and industry in Chicago.

Despite the settlement of these early Countryside inhabitants, the area largely remained a quiet farming community until the post-World War II era when suburban areas such as Countryside began to experience explosive growth. The area's first residential subdivision was LaGrange Terrace, built in 1947; it was later followed by the Don L. Dise and Edgewood Park subdivisions in the 1950s.

The City of Countryside was officially incorporated in 1960.

Around 1917, the Marx Brothers family (later a famous comedy team) bought a chicken farm near Joliet Road (Route 66) and La Grange Road. Groucho Marx later claimed that the brothers spent too much time at Wrigley Field watching the Chicago Cubs to make the farm economically viable.

Geography

Demographics

As of the 2020 census there were 6,420 people, 2,543 households, and 1,531 families residing in the city. The racial makeup of the city was 72.94% White, 2.83% African American, 2.27% Asian, 0.53% Native American, 0.05% Pacific Islander, 9.45% from other races, and 11.92% from two or more races. Hispanic or Latino of any race were 24.00% of the population.

There were 2,543 households, out of which 47.35% had children under the age of 18 living with them, 40.11% were married couples living together, 10.58% had a female householder with no husband present, and 39.80% were non-families. 36.02% of all households were made up of individuals, and 10.70% had someone living alone who was 65 years of age or older. The average household size was 3.09 and the average family size was 2.32.

The city's age distribution consisted of 21.0% under the age of 18, 9.3% from 18 to 24, 19.2% from 25 to 44, 34.2% from 45 to 64, and 16.1% who were 65 years of age or older. The median age was 45.2 years. For every 100 females, there were 108.7 males. For every 100 females age 18 and over, there were 106.6 males.

The median income for a household in the city was $67,201, and the median income for a family was $90,804. Males had a median income of $52,837 versus $38,649 for females. The per capita income for the city was $44,265. About 5.7% of families and 6.8% of the population were below the poverty line, including 13.2% of those under age 18 and 4.3% of those age 65 or over.

Note: the US Census treats Hispanic/Latino as an ethnic category. This table excludes Latinos from the racial categories and assigns them to a separate category. Hispanics/Latinos can be of any race.

Economy
The International Union of Operating Engineers (IUOE) Local 150 is based in Countryside at 6200 Joliet Road.

Countryside Plaza is a large draw for regional shopping.

Government
Countryside is in Illinois's 3rd congressional district.

Education
Countryside is served by La Grange School District 105 and Pleasantdale School District 107. Elementary students attend Ideal Elementary School in Countryside or Pleasantdale Elementary School in Willow Springs. Middle school students attend William F.Gurrie Middle School in La Grange or Pleasantdale Middle School in Burr Ridge IL. High school students move onto Lyons Township High School District 204 which has campuses in La Grange, and Western Springs.

Infrastructure

Fire department
Countryside is served by the Pleasantview Fire Protection District, founded in 1946. It is directed by a Board of Trustees which is elected by the areas which make up the district. The fire district currently maintains three stations in its coverage area.

References

External links

City of Countryside official website

Cities in Illinois
Chicago metropolitan area
Cities in Cook County, Illinois
Populated places established in 1960
1960 establishments in Illinois